Valley View is a census-designated place (CDP) in Schuylkill County, Pennsylvania, United States. The population was 1,677 at the 2000 census.

Geography
Valley View is located at  (40.645118, -76.538053).

According to the United States Census Bureau, the CDP has a total area of 3.3 square miles (8.5 km), all  land.

Demographics
At the 2000 census there were 1,677 people, 713 households, and 491 families living in the CDP. The population density was 512.3 people per square mile (198.0/km). There were 756 housing units at an average density of 230.9/sq mi (89.3/km).  The racial makeup of the CDP was 98.63% White, 0.12% African American, 0.30% Asian, 0.12% Pacific Islander, 0.48% from other races, and 0.36% from two or more races. Hispanic or Latino of any race were 0.83%.

Of the 713 households 25.5% had children under the age of 18 living with them, 59.0% were married couples living together, 6.2% had a female householder with no husband present, and 31.0% were non-families. 27.1% of households were one person and 16.7% were one person aged 65 or older. The average household size was 2.35 and the average family size was 2.83.

The age distribution was 19.3% under the age of 18, 8.5% from 18 to 24, 25.6% from 25 to 44, 23.5% from 45 to 64, and 23.0% 65 or older. The median age was 43 years. For every 100 females, there were 94.3 males. For every 100 females age 18 and over, there were 92.2 males.

The median household income was $37,838 and the median family income  was $43,558. Males had a median income of $30,071 versus $26,161 for females. The per capita income for the CDP was $17,817. About 1.2% of families and 4.1% of the population were below the poverty line, including 3.9% of those under age 18 and 8.4% of those age 65 or over.

Gallery

References

Census-designated places in Schuylkill County, Pennsylvania
Census-designated places in Pennsylvania